Simple speech (prosta mova, prostaya mova; "(to speak) in a simple way"), also translated as "simple language" or "simple talk", is an informal reference to various uncodified vernacular forms of Ukrainian and Belarusian in the areas historically influenced by Polish culture.

This term has been commonly used, e.g., as a reply to the question about the mother tongue or language spoken at home by the Tutejszy in the historical region of Kresy, which covers parts of modern Ukraine, Belarus, Lithuania and a bit of Latvia.

It also refers to the vernacular form of Ukrainian before its codification ("Old Ukrainian" of 16th–18th centuries). In 16th century the chancellery language of the Grand Duchy of Lithuania was Old Ruthenian ("руска мова", commonly called "simple speech" ("проста мова".). According to Christian Stang, it was based on the Ruthenian dialects of the region around Vilnius.

Also, the Podlachian microlanguage is referred to by locals as "our speech" (Своя мова), "simple speech" (проста мова), or "local speech" (тутейша мова) (cf. "Tutejszy").

The term "simple" refers to the speech of "simple people",  as a distinction to the "high style" of official and written language of the time and region: Church Slavonic in the case of Old Ukrainian of 16th–17th centuries and the Grand Duchy of Lithuania, and the Polish language in the case of Kresy.

The versions of "simple speech" differ depending on the region.

Polish linguist Mirosław Jankowiak reported in 2015 that most people in rural areas of Vilnius Region who declare themselves as Poles speak Belarusian "simple speech". He notes that it is difficult to explain the discrepancy between the declared ethnicity and language: the locals can be either Polonized Belarusians, or Belarusianized Poles, or even Belarusianized Lithuanians who later became Polonized. He also notes a linguistic puzzle on how "simple speech" survived without codification and formal education despite 200 years of Russification and tens of years of Polonization.

Jankowiak also notes that Bronisław Taraszkiewicz who was first to codify the Belarusian language  (1918, "Taraškievica") hailed from Mačiuliškės of Vilnius region, and it appears that his version of Belarusian was influenced by the "simple speech" native to him.

See also
Tutejszy

References

Further reading
Michał Sajewicz, "'Nasza mowa prosta', czyli o białorusko-ukraińskiej granicy językowej na Białostocczyźnie", Nad Buhom i Narwoju, 1992, nr 3.
 Смирнова Екатерина Андреевна, 
"Проста мова", Русская речь, 2009
 "Проста мова" как лингвистический феномен (реконструкция глагольной системы на материале Евангелия Тяпинского) (Ph.D thesis summary), 2011

Belarusian language
Ukrainian language varieties and styles